The Wisconsin Collegiate Conference (WCC) was a collegiate athletic conference made up of the branch campuses in the University of Wisconsin System. The teams competed in co-ed soccer, women's volleyball, men's basketball, and women's basketball. Only three schools competed in all four sports. All schools are considered junior colleges and athletes are only eligible for two years.

Men's tennis and men's golf were formerly sponsored by the conference; the former was discontinued after the 2016 season and the latter after the 2018 season.

In 2020, after all schools suspended athletic events due to the COVID-19 pandemic, the WCC quietly disbanded. The satellite campuses of UW-Green Bay, UW-Oshkosh, and UW-Stevens Point formed a new conference, the Wisconsin Competitive Sports League.

Member schools

Sponsored sports by school

References

External links 

College sports in Wisconsin
Defunct college sports conferences in the United States